Corryn is both a surname and a given name, and a variation of the name Corina or Corinne. Notable people with either the surname or given name include:

Surname
Alexander Corryn (born 1994), Belgian footballer
Milan Corryn (born 1999), Belgian professional footballer

Given
Corryn Brown (born 1995), Canadian curler
Corryn Rayney (1963-2007), Indian murder victim

See also
Coryn (name)
Corinne (disambiguation)
Corrine (disambiguation)
Corrinne
Corin
Corine (disambiguation)
Korin (disambiguation)
Korine
Corrin (disambiguation)